Cleveland Hill School District is a K-12 school district within the Cleveland Hill hamlet of Cheektowaga, New York.

Fire of 1954

In 1954, a fire at the elementary school facility claimed the lives of 15 sixth-grade students, and severely burned Jackson C. Frank. The facility was made entirely of wood, prompting the United States to introduce code that prohibited wooden buildings from housing schools.

Notable alumni
Antwon Burton – Football player, 2015 ECC Hall of Fame Inductee (Class of 2001)
Sal Capaccio – Buffalo Bills beat and sideline reporter for WGR (Class of 1991)
Steve Fister – Musician, former lead guitarist of Steppenwolf (Class of 1975)
Jackson C. Frank – Musician (Class of 1961)
Kim Griffin – Head coach of Canisius Golden Griffins softball (Class of 2003)
Nan Harvey – former Buffalo Bulls coach, 2012 Greater Buffalo Sports Hall of Fame Inductee (Class of 1974)
Chae Hawk – Musician (Class of 2002)
Damone Jackson – Musician (Class of 2009)
Molly Kennedy – Motivational Speaker (Class of 1992)
John Konsek – Golfer, 2015 NYSGA Hall of Fame Inductee (Class of 1958)
James C. Litz – Artist (Class of 1966)
Leia Militello – Broadcaster for WKBW-TV (Class of 1993)
Jo Ann Miller – Miss New York 1973, illustration consultant (Class of 1971)
Robert Nowak – Basketball player, 2004 ECC Hall of Fame Inductee (Class of 1966)
Mark Parisi – Head coach of USCAA Champion Daemen Wildcats Women's Volleyball team (Class of 1980)
Roger Peck – Founder and President of Crown Energy Services, Inc. (Class of 1968)
Aaron Phillips – Professional baseball player (Class of 2015)
Trevor Sajdak – Bodybuilder (Class of 1988)
Christopher Scolese – Associate administrator of NASA (Class of 1974)
Ashlee Thomas – Miss Howard University 2011 (Class of 2009)
William Wieczorek – Director, Center for Health and Human Research at Buffalo State College (Class of 1977)

References

External links

School districts in New York (state)
Education in Erie County, New York